The term "mass market" refers to a market for goods produced on a large scale for a significant number of end consumers. The mass market differs from the niche market in that the former focuses on consumers with a wide variety of backgrounds with no identifiable preferences and expectations in a large market segment. Traditionally, businesses reach out to the mass market with advertising messages through a variety of media including radio, TV, newspapers and the Web.

Definition

Scholars have noted that defining the precise nature of the mass market is problematic. This difficulty arises, at least in part, from scholarly attention being given to the process of mass marketing rather than the mass market, per se. In addition, the concept of a mass market means different things in different contexts and has evolved over time, adding yet another layer of complexity.
The ‘'Cambridge Business English Dictionary  defines a mass market as:

A mass market, also known as undifferentiated market, is a large group of current and/or prospective customers, where individual members share similar needs. The size of a mass market depends on the product category. Mass marketers typically aim at between 50 and 100 percent of the total market potential. For example, the laundry detergent, Tide, reportedly had a 65% in-store market share (in the US) by developing a “good for everybody” product and targeting a broad middle-class market. By the 1980s, Coca Cola commanded almost 70% share of the US market 
Mass market products and brands offer lower acceptable quality, are mass-produced, widely distributed and typically rely on mass media to create high levels of market awareness and ultimately market penetration. A premium brand, in contrast, combines elements of luxury and mass market, appealing to a broad market with higher quality products, often designed by high profile designers, with unique or prestige points of differentiation and offered at reasonable prices. Premium brands offer an alternative to luxury goods.

History

The concept of a ‘mass market’ is relatively modern. Prior to the industrial revolution, a market referred to a physical place (i.e., a marketplace). However, by the late 18th century, people could participate in the market without physically attending a marketplace. By the 20th century, the concept could be used to describe a process (mass production/mass marketing), a group of consumers as well as a physical place. The process, mass marketing, involves the pursuit of an entire market or a large proportion of the market with a single product and a single marketing program. In mass marketing, there is no market differentiation and no product differentiation. .Cambridge Dictionary, [Online: https://dictionary.cambridge.org/dictionary/english/mass-market]

The term, 'mass market’, emerged in the 19th century and had its origins in social, political and economic transformations occurring across the developed world throughout the 17th, 18th and early 19th centuries. Population growth combined with rising wages, higher standards of living, concentrated populations, increasing urbanisation, increased social mobility and the rise of a middle-class fuelled a rise in demand for goods and services. To meet this demand, industry was restructured: manufacturers needed new production, distribution and merchandising systems to satisfy the growing demand for affordable goods and services. As certain historians have noted, the supply-side 'industrial revolution’ was accompanied by a demand-side 'consumer revolution’.Neil McKendrick, John Brewer and J.H. Plumb, The Birth of a Consumer Society: The Commercialization of Eighteenth-Century England, Indiana University Press, Bloomington, 1982

By the 17th century, raw materials, manufactured goods and foodstuffs were being transported around the globe. However, for mass market accessibility, effective domestic transportation and communication systems, such as the railways and the telegraph, were essential preconditions. Scholars point to the second half of the 19th century as a forming a 'revolution in distribution’ with innovations in transportation, storage and packaging enabling rapid, efficient movement of goods across vast distances. Mass production techniques, facilitated by technological developments, enabled the production of low-cost, standardised products designed to appeal to a broad cross-section of the market.
By the 20th century, new distribution systems gradually supplanted the peddlers, hawkers and small, independent retailers that had characterised pre-industrial supply channels. As the century progressed, improvements in the supply chain gave rise to a plethora of innovative mass market retailers – from department stores through to franchises and chain stores.
Notable early examples of mass marketers include:

	Kodak: George Eastman, who founded Kodak in 1888, revolutionised photography when he developed inexpensive, portable cameras and effectively created a mass market for amateur photographersBernard Weisberger, “George Eastman and the Creation of a Mass Market”, American Heritage, vol 23, no. 6, 1972 To highlight the camera’s ease of use, the campaign slogan promised, ““You press the button, we do the rest” (1888).

	Ford Motor Company: Henry Ford perfected the moving assembly line in order to produce a high-quality automobile (the model T) priced within the reach of a market of unprecedented size.”Ford and the Assembly Line”,  Encyclopedia Britannica, “ [Online: https://www.britannica.com/technology/automotive-industry/Ford-and-the-assembly-line<ref]

	Coca-Cola: When Asa Candler purchased the Coca-Cola recipe in 1891, his strategy was to mass market the beverage across the US, by producing a single 6.5-ounce bottle in only one flavour. The company made a concerted effort to appeal to every segment of society, using a national distribution system via food retailers (as opposed to the drugstores used during the formative years). At its peak, in the late 1980s, Coca Cola commanded almost 70 percent market share 

Rise and fall of the mass market

The primary aim of mass marketing is to provide standardised products to the largest number of customers at minimum acceptable quality points and at lowest possible prices. To achieve this, companies design no-frills products, employ long production runs and rely on low margins and volume sales in order to maintain low unit costs.

In the mass market, players must compete with other high-volume producers. As a consequence, the product with the lowest price, given comparable acceptable quality, will enjoy a market advantage. This tends to lead to a focus on prices which means that companies must relentlessly pursuit of cost savings across every aspect of business operations – simplified product design, streamlined supply chains and minimum tolerable service quality.Amitava Chattopadhyay, Rajeev Batra, Aysegul Ozsomer, The New Emerging Market Multinationals: Four Strategies for Disrupting Markets and Building Brands, Mc-Graw-Hill, 2012, p. 19

In developed nations, marketers regularly create a mass market for goods and services. For example, a sophisticated new product such as an MP3 player, might firstly tearget early adopters in upper income groups and subsequently simplify the offer and reduce prices in order to gain acceptance by a larger proportion of the potential market.

In developed economies, mass marketing is becoming less common as an approach. However, it remains a vital part of marketing in developed economies well into the 21st century. Mass marketing is primarily used in commodity markets (e.g., sugar, salt, fruit and vegetables, etc.); very small markets (where segmentation would result in segments too small to be profitable); for products and brands satisfying universal needs (e.g., pens, pencils, newspapers) and in less competitive markets.

As markets in the US and Europe have become increasingly fragmented, consumers are exhibiting a greater desire for choice, customisation and product differentiation. This has led to some companies, shifting away from serving a single mass market towards serving a number of smaller markets or segments. However, the size of these segments remains relatively large. Multinationals such as Campbell’s and Coca Cola enjoy enormous reach across global markets. Whereas, Coke, for example, was once only available in a single flavour and bottle size, it is now offered in multitude of different flavours, different sized bottles and with varying sugar- no-sugar options.Richard Tedlow, New and Improved: The Story of Mass Marketing in America, Heinemann, 1990, UK, p. xx viii and p. 54

As growth in developed markets begins to slow, multinational corporations are looking towards emerging markets for new growth and scale economies. Markets in parts of Asia, Africa, South America and Eastern Europe, with their rapid population growth, youthful populations, growing economies, rising standards of living and emergent middle-class present companies with significant long-term opportunities.Raquel Cataño and David Flores, “Consumer Behaviour in Emerging Markets” in: R. Grosse and K.E. Meyer, The Oxford Handbook of Management in Emerging Markets, Oxford University Press, 2019, p. 230

For companies desirous of entering emerging markets, a key business decision is which of the two income segments to target – a small but wealthy elite (niche market) or a large but relatively poor mass market.Raquel Cataño and David Flores, “Consumer Behaviour in Emerging Markets” in: R.Grosse and K.E. Meyer, The Oxford Handbook of Management in Emerging Markets, Oxford University Press, 2019, p. 230 The resources and capabilities required to compete in emerging economies are quite different to those used in developed markets. In particular, companies need extensive local knowledge, including a rich understanding of local distribution networks and a deep understanding of consumer purchasing habits.

Consumer behaviour in emerging mass markets is quite unlike that observed elsewhere.  Mass market needs revolve around basic necessities and functional products. Although regional differences are evident, some commonalities have been noted: consumers are extremely price-conscious; prefer unbranded goods, buy in smaller quantities, only buy sufficient amounts as required for immediate use and often exhibit a preference for local retail outlets where they can buy a single item, such as a bar of soap, from broken packs.C.S. Krishna Prasad, “Are Mid-Segment Markets in India Still Elusive to MNCs?”  in: A Adhikari, Strategic Management Issues in Emerging Markets, Springer, [e-book], p. 200

Multinationals such as Unilever and Colgate-Palmolive have successfully tapped into emerging mass markets, while others have struggled. Kellogg’s foray into India failed to establish market acceptance for cereal as an alternative breakfast food. Unilever’s laundry detergent, Ala, achieved market success in southern Brazil, but was unable to gain a foothold in the northeast, where women continue to wash laundry in streams and have a preference for bar soap.Jagdish N. Sheth, Mona Sinha, Reshma Shah Breakout Strategies for Emerging Markets: Business and Marketing Tactics for Achieving Growth, Pearson, N.J., 2016, e-book, n.p. In Paraguay, the telecommunications operator, Tigo, was initially reluctant to reduce the minimum recharge rate for phone cards. However, its sales volume tripled when it allowed users to recharge for just a few centavos. The company learned that customers were using the cards as a form of savings and also made calls at night when rates were lower, thereby boosting off peak usage volumes.

 Mass Market Retailers 

A mass-market retailer is an organization that reasonably sells enormous amounts of products that appeal to a wide assortment of buyers. Mass-market retailers are not really known for selling sturdy, top notch stock or for having uncommon client assistance, yet they do meet customers' needs a lot at sensible costs. Some examples of mass retailers are Big-box stores such as Target, Sam's Club, and Best Buy, as well as brands like Levi Strauss and Gap, and e-retailers like Amazon.

 Mass Market Retailers Vs Luxury Retailers 

In terms of Mass Market vs Luxury Retailers, Luxury Retailers sell their products to specific consumers. Their target market is for wealthy consumers who purchase upscale products frequently, products that tend to be unobtainable for the regular consumer. Some examples of Luxury Retailers include Barney's, Tiffany's, Saks & Fifth etc.

 Mass Market Advantages 

 Mass Marketing is the degree and cost-proficiency of advertising on a bigger scale compared to smaller business Marketing systems.
 Increases brand awareness
 Power to control the Market (scare future competitors away)

 Mass Market Disadvantages 

 Will leave smaller companies more vulnerable
 Always changing consumer Market

 The Decline 
“Technology has enabled consumers to skip over these mass-market models. Amazon and Google allow them to quickly and easily search out specific products that speak to them.” People are not associating or committing to a certain brand, rather, whatever is more convenient for them when looking at quality, price, and availability.

When looking at mass market, we can include television as a contributor. TV shows are made to appeal to whoever wants to tune in and to however many people that attention brings. There has been a significant fall off in the number of viewers that the biggest TV shows are pulling in as opposed to 25 or so years prior. This decrease is largely attributed to the presence of social media and self-published apps and streaming services like Netflix, Hulu, HBO, etc. "Oprah, at her height, had 48 million viewers per week''. Now, the biggest daytime TV stars, like Ellen DeGeneres or Dr. Phil, draw less than one-tenth of that per week." Daytime television will never capture that big of an audience ever again based on the number of different options people have at their disposal today. This is one of the many instances where mass market is becoming obsolete.

See also 
Big-box store
Luxury Retailers
Mass behavior
Mass customization
Mass consumption (aka "consumerism")
Mass marketing
Mass media
Mass merchandiser
Mass movement
Mass production
The masses
Niche market

References

Market (economics)
Mass production